Gonatotrichus silhouettensis is a species of millipede in the family Siphonophoridae. The species is endemic to Silhouette Island in Seychelles.

References

Animals described in 1980
Siphonophorida
Millipedes of Africa
Arthropods of Seychelles
Endemic fauna of Seychelles